Moran Creek is a stream in Todd County, in the U.S. state of Minnesota.

Moran Creek bears the name of a lumberman.

See also
List of rivers of Minnesota

References

Rivers of Todd County, Minnesota
Rivers of Minnesota